Cheung Tsing Bridge, formerly Rambler Channel Bridge, is a bridge crossing Rambler Channel in Hong Kong, connecting Cheung Tsing Tunnel on Tsing Yi Island and Kwai Chung section of Tsing Kwai Highway. It is part of Tsing Kwai Highway of Route 3. It is also a part of the Airport Core Programme, being a part of Route 3.

Built next to Tsing Yi Bridge, Cheung Tsing Bridge is the second bridge to connect Kwai Chung and Tsing Yi. Duplicate Tsing Yi South Bridge was built afterwards in 1999. 

The bridge was later given the name Cheung Tsing because of its proximity to Cheung Ching Estate and Cheung Tsing Tunnel.

External links

 

Bridges in Hong Kong
Tsing Yi
Route 3 (Hong Kong)